The Prince Philip movement is a religious sect followed by the Kastom people around the villages of Yaohnanen and Yakel on the southern island of Tanna in Vanuatu. It is a cargo cult of the Yaohnanen tribe, who believe in the divinity of Prince Philip, Duke of Edinburgh (1921–2021), once consort to Queen Elizabeth II.

Origins
According to ancient Yaohnanen tales, the son of a mountain spirit travelled over them. He was sometimes said to be a brother to John Frum.

The people of the Yaohnanen and Takel area had seen the respect accorded to Queen Elizabeth II by the colonial officials and concluded that her husband, Prince Philip, must be the son referred to in their legends.

It is unclear just when this belief came about, but it was probably some time in the 1950s or 1960s. It was strengthened by the royal couple's official visit to Vanuatu in 1974, when a few villagers had the opportunity to actually see Prince Philip from a distance. The Prince was not then aware of the sect, but it was brought to his attention several years later by John Champion, the British Resident Commissioner in the New Hebrides.

Interactions with Prince Philip 
Champion suggested that Prince Philip send them a portrait of himself. He agreed and sent a signed official photograph. The villagers responded by sending him a traditional pig-killing club called a nal-nal. In compliance with their request, the Prince sent a photograph of himself posing with the club. Another photograph was sent in 2000. All three photographs were kept by Chief Jack Naiva, who died in 2009.

Anne, Princess Royal, visited Tanna in October 2014. She is the only daughter of Queen Elizabeth II and Prince Philip. She had visited Vanuatu in 1974, but had not previously travelled to the island. Charles III, then Prince of Wales, visited the island in 2018.

On 27 September 2007, Channel 4 broadcast Meet the Natives, a reality show about five Tanna men from the Prince Philip Movement on a visit to Britain. Their trip culminated in an off-screen audience with Philip, where gifts were exchanged, including a new photograph of the Prince.

The sect celebrated the 2018 wedding of Prince Harry and Meghan Markle by holding a party, where they hoisted the Union Jack, danced, and ate pigs. The villagers were initially unaware of the wedding, until a travel agent for the island, who was contacted by The Times, relayed the message.

Reaction to Prince Philip's death 
In April 2021, the sect mourned Prince Philip's death. Village Chief Albi said that he was "terribly, terribly sorry" that he died and tribal leader Chief Yapa sent his condolences to the Royal Family and the people of the UK. The Union Flag was flown at half mast on the grounds of the nakamal. A formal mourning period was declared and many tribespeople gathered on 12 April in a ceremony to remember the Duke, where men took turns to speak and pay tribute to him. For the next few weeks, villagers met periodically to conduct rites for him, whom they see as a "recycled descendant of a very powerful spirit or god that lives on one of their mountains". They conducted ritualistic dance, held a procession, and displayed memorabilia of the Duke, while the men drank kava, a ceremonial drink made from the roots of the kava plant. The period of mourning culminated with a "significant gathering" where a great deal of yams and kava plants were on display. Numerous pigs were also killed for the ceremony. Referring to the Queen, Chief Jack Malia said though the Duke is dead, they still have a connection with the 'mother' of the royal family. Many of the tribesmen believe that while his body lies at rest, the Duke's soul will return to "its spiritual home, the island of Tanna".

Kirk Huffman, an anthropologist familiar with the group, said that after their period of mourning the group would probably transfer their veneration to Prince Charles (now King Charles III), who had visited Vanuatu in 2018 and met with some of the tribal leaders.

Media coverage
In 2010, Australian journalist Amos Roberts visited Tanna and reported on the locals' celebration of Philip's 89th birthday, for SBS's magazine program Dateline.
In 2011, the people of Yaohnanen village were featured in an episode of the second series of An Idiot Abroad with Karl Pilkington.
In 2013, Man Belong Mrs Queen, a book by British writer Matthew Baylis, investigated the historical and anthropological origins of the movement and provided an account of the author's own stay on the island of Tanna.
Kate Humble talks to locals about the movement in Kate Humble: Into the Volcano, a TV documentary about Mount Yasur broadcast on BBC Two in January 2015.
In 2018, the Australian podcast Zealot documented the Prince Philip Movement in episode 13.
The six-part 2018 TV documentary, The Pacific: In the Wake of Captain Cook with Sam Neill, included a segment featuring the Prince Philip movement.
In April 2021, an episode of the BBC World Service podcast Heart and Soul titled "Prince belong Vanuatu" covered the group's belief that Prince Philip was returning to his ancestral home on their Pacific island in spirit form.

References

Further reading

External links 
Squires, Nick. "Prince Philip, they hardly know ye", Christian Science Monitor, 8 June 2007, accessed 7 June 2007
Squires, Nick. "Is Prince Philip an island god?", BBC News, 10 June 2007, accessed 10 June 2007
Adams, Guy. "Strange island: Pacific tribesmen come to study Britain", The Independent, 20 November 2007

Prince Philip, Duke of Edinburgh
Vanuatu mythology
Cargo cults
New religious movement deities
Deified people